Charles Dent may refer to:

 Charlie Dent (born 1960), American politician
 John Charles Dent (1841–1888), Canadian author and journalist
 Charles Dent (politician) (born 1951), Northwest Territories politician
 Charles Enrique Dent (1911–1976), physician and biochemist